Inna Heights is the fifth studio album by Jamaican dancehall reggae artist Buju Banton. It was released on November 18, 1997 through Penthouse Records. Production was handled by Donovan Germain. It features guest appearances from Beres Hammond, Jahmali, King Stitt, Ras Shiloh, Red Rat and Toots Hibbert. The album was nominated for a Grammy Award for Best Reggae Album at the 41st Annual Grammy Awards, but lost to Sly and Robbie's Friends.

Track listing

Charts

References

External links

1997 albums
Buju Banton albums
Albums produced by Donovan Germain